UM or um may refer to:

Universities
 U of M (disambiguation) or UM, abbreviation for various universities

Businesses
 Universal McCann, a global advertising and media agency
 United Motors Company, a former name of American automotive parts supplier ACDelco
 Air Zimbabwe (IATA code UM)

Science and technology
 .um, the Top-Level Domain for United States Minor Outlying Islands
 Um interface, the air interface for the GSM mobile telephone standard
 Micrometre (μm), sometimes written as "um" in limited character sets
 Unified Model, a global numerical weather prediction model
 Ultrarapid metabolizer, a term used in pharmacogenomics to refer to individuals with substantially increased metabolic activity
 User manual, a  document or manual intended to give assistance to people using a particular system
 Utilization management, the evaluation of the appropriateness, medical need and efficiency of health care

Other uses
 Um (Korean surname)
 "Um", an exclamation or filler in spoken conversation
 Um (cuneiform), a sign in cuneiform writing
 Umphrey's McGee, a jam band
 Unofficial magistrate, as a postnominal
 Unified Messaging, in marketing
 United States Minor Outlying Islands (ISO 3166 code UM)
 Union for the Mediterranean, an intergovernmental organization of 43 countries from Europe and the Mediterranean Basin
 Uttaradi Math, a Hindu matha (monastery)
 United Methodist, a religious organization